The Ajoie (Franc-Comtois: Aidjoue) is an historic region roughly coinciding with Porrentruy District in the canton of Jura in northwestern Switzerland.

It is a part of the Jura plain, composed of six geographic areas:

 the Vendline (river) valley (northeast), with the communities Vendlincourt, Bonfol and Beurnevésin;
 La Baroche (east):  Miécourt, Charmoille, Fregiécourt, Pleujouse and Asuel;
 the flanc du Mont-Terri (south):  Cornol, Courgenay, Fontenais and Bressaucourt;
 the Haute-Ajoie (west): Courtedoux, Chevenez, Rocourt, Roche-d'Or, Réclère, Damvant, Grandfontaine, Fahy and Bure;
 Allaine (river) valley (centre and north):  Alle, Porrentruy, Courchavon, Courtemaîche, Montignez, Buix and Boncourt;
 the Coeuvatte valley (north): Coeuve, Damphreux and Lugnez.

The inhabitants are mainly Roman Catholic.  Each year on St. Martin's Day they enjoy a substantial banquet lasting for many hours, and composed of all the various cuts of freshly butchered pigs, together with regional wines and shots of damassine, the regional AOC eau de vie.

It is also the perfect occasion to discover and enjoy the traditions and other numerous products of the Ajoie terroir.

The Swiss Army has established a large military camp for their armoured corps close to the Swiss-French border, on Bure territory.

External links
 fr Swiss Historic Dictionary 
 fr Portal of the Area

Geography of the canton of Jura